Whihala Beach County Park is a park in Whiting, Indiana, United States. It is a public beach with life guards. The beach was previously named Whiting Beach.

Whihala Beach is named after the nearby cities of Whiting and Hammond and Lake County Parks Department.

References

External links
Lake County Parks – Whihala Beach County Park

Protected areas of Lake County, Indiana
Parks in Indiana
Whiting, Indiana
Lake Michigan